Corruption in Bulgaria has decreased in recent years, after a series of reforms implemented through EU guidance. Among recent improvements, amendments to the constitution in 2015 brought about a reform of the Supreme Judicial Council and a stronger judicial inspectorate. Furthermore, the broader legislative framework has seen a number of reforms over the years, in particular through the amendments of the Judicial System Act in 2016 and of the Criminal Procedure Code in 2017.

Corruption Perceptions Index 

The Corruption Perceptions Index (CPI) is released by Transparency International at the beginning of each year. The report is based on the polling of experts from around the world on topics such as a free press, integrity, and independent judiciaries. In the CPI, lower-ranked countries experience “untrustworthy and badly functioning public institutions like the police and judiciary.”

In the 2022 Corruption Perceptions Index, Bulgaria scored 43 on a scale from 0 ("highly corrupt") to 100 ("very clean"). When ranked by score, Bulgaria ranked 72nd among the 180 countries in the Index, where the country ranked first is perceived to have the most honest public sector.  For comparison, the best score was 90 (ranked 1), and the worst score was 12 (ranked 180).

Types of corruption

Lobbying 
A 2014 study by Transparency International indicated that lobbying in Bulgaria is mainly unregulated and happens behind closed doors. “The report Lobbying in Bulgaria: Interests, Influence, Politics shows that there are significant deficits in the transparency, integrity, and equality of access regarding influence over public decision-making in the country.” The study used a framework from a project called “lifting the lid on lobbying,” and Bulgaria received a “paltry overall score of only 25%.” For transparency, Bulgaria received a score of 13%; for integrity, 25%; and 38% for free quality of access. By 2014, four legislative proposals had been introduced in Bulgaria's parliament, but none of the bills passed.

Vote-buying 
During the 2014 parliamentary election, Bulgaria’s Transparency International telephone helpline received 202 complaints. One of the top three complaints concerned vote-buying. A pub owner in a small village offered Roma voters –$55 to vote a certain way, with the money paid only if the political party in question won. Some 480,000 illegally printed ballots were discovered at a printing house in Kostinbrod the day before the May 2013 parliamentary election. The blank ballots might have been prepared to manipulate the vote. The owner of the printing house, a municipal councilor from GERB, claimed that the ballots were technical spoilage.

Judiciary 
In 2017, the Council of Europe expressed concern about the lack of judicial independence and the compromised separation of powers in the country. The Venice Commission has raised concern about the Soviet model of Bulgaria's Prosecution, which turns it into “a source of corruption and blackmail.” Civil activists have demanded the resignation of Bulgaria's General Prosecutor Sotir Tsatsarov for some time now, due to his alleged involvement in high-profile corruption cases.

Public tenders 
Government procurement is an area of significant corruption risk. Many of the public contracts are awarded to a few politically connected companies amid widespread irregularities, procedure violations, and tailor-made award criteria. Ognyan Gerdzhikov's interim government found widespread violations in defense procurement, after it took over from the Second Borisov Government in 2017; 45 out of 82 defense ministry contracts signed the previous year were in breach of public procurement laws and regulations. Fraud was strongly suspected in nine of the procedures.

An estimated 10 billion leva ($5.99 billion) of state budget and European cohesion funds are spent on public tenders each year; nearly 14 billion ($8.38 billion) were spent on public contracts in 2017 alone.

Effects

Economic mismanagement 
Corruption has resulted in significant economic losses and underperformance in Bulgaria. Since its accession to the EU in 2007, it has remained the Union's poorest country, with a per-capita GDP of $16,300—less than half the European average. By 2014, the Bulgarian government was accused of mismanaging the economy so badly that the European Union froze billions of euros in aid. Between 2008 and 2018, foreign direct investment collapsed, dropping from 28% to 2% of GDP, or $9 billion to just $1.13 billion. The cabinets of Boyko Borisov have been in power through most of the decade, establishing a system of impunity for high-profile crime, and favoritism of certain local companies. Approximately 22% of GDP is lost to corruption each year, and a number of major foreign companies, like ČEZ Group, have withdrawn from Bulgaria.

Social unrest 
Corruption is a source of profound public discontent. Corruption and government inaction against convicted Roma criminal Kiril Rashkov sparked the 2011 anti-Roma riots. The 2013 Bulgarian protests against the first Borisov cabinet spread to over 30 cities, and were marked by seven self-immolations, five of which were fatal. The protests, directed against corruption, poverty, and political parties, led to the resignation of the First Borisov Government. Mass demonstrations continued against the government of Plamen Oresharski, which also resigned following the appointment of Delyan Peevski as head of the State Agency for National Security. Another wave of demonstrations occurred in November 2018 against low wages, as well as fuel price and vehicle tax hikes. Some 20 cities saw protests demanding the resignation of the Third Borisov Government; several major roads were blocked. Grand corruption disclosures in June 2020 led to the 2020-2021 Bulgarian mass anti-government protests. This was the cause of GERB losing the April and July 2021 parliamentary elections after ruling the country for 12 years.

Deterioration of media freedom 
According to Reporters Without Borders, the press industry in Bulgaria is rife with “corruption and collusion between media, politicians, and oligarchs.” Media ownership is opaque, not transparent, and concentrated in the hands of a few owners—despite a superficial diversity in ownership. Upon joining the European Union in 2007, Bulgaria ranked 35th on the Press Freedom Index, alongside France. It has since tumbled to 111th, by far the worst press freedom performer of any EU member and candidate state. More than 90% of Bulgarian journalists, as polled by the Association of European Journalists, have reported frequent interference with their work. Lawmakers have gone as far as threatening TV journalists with sacking during a live broadcast. The media environment has been further degraded by EU funds diverted by the government to sympathetic media outlets. In 2018, two journalists were detained and later released by police while they investigated a massive scheme to drain EU funds by a company associated with a number of high-profile government procurement projects.

Progress in anti-corruption measures 

In Bulgaria, the period since the report of November 2018 to around 2021 was characterised by relative political stability, though a particular controversy emerged around allegations concerning the acquisition of
properties at below-market prices by high-level officials and politicians.

In the November 2018 CVM report, benchmarks one (judicial independence), two (legal framework) and six (organized crime) have been provisionally closed, noting that Bulgaria has made significant progress in these areas. Judicial appointments and the functioning of the judicial inspectorate were identified as areas for ongoing monitoring, and certain aspects of the legal environment also remained open for further consideration in the context of other benchmarks.

The Commission’s latest CVM report, adopted in October 2019, recorded that Bulgaria had made a number of further commitments and concluded that the progress made under the CVM was sufficient to meet
Bulgaria's commitments made at the time of its accession to the EU.

References

External links
 Transparency International Bulgaria
 Bulgaria parliament passes anti-corruption law under EU pressure
 Magnitsky sanctions